Army of the West may refer to:
Army of the West (1793), a French Revolutionary unit during the French Revolutionary Wars
Army of the West (1846), a United States army during the Mexican-American War 
Army of the West (1862), a Confederate States army during the American Civil War
Army of Mississippi, also known as Army of the West, Confederate States army during the American Civil War
Army of the West (Union Army), an 1861 Union Army, during the American Civil War led by Brigadier General Nathaniel Lyon.